Sellers is an unincorporated community in Champaign County, Illinois, United States. Sellers is northeast of Urbana.

References

Unincorporated communities in Champaign County, Illinois
Unincorporated communities in Illinois